Frank E. Putnam (January 9, 1857 – July 6, 1944) was an American lawyer and politician.

Putnam was born in Grafton, Vermont and graduated from Vermont Academy. He went to University of Michigan Law School, in 1884, and was admitted to the Minnesota bar in 1885. Putnam lived in Blue Earth, Faribault County, Minnesota, with his wife and family and practiced law in Blue Earth. He served as the Blue Earth City Attorney and as the Faribault County Attorney. Putnam served in the Minnesota Senate from 1903 to 1930 and was a Republican. He also served as president of the Minnesota State Bar Association in 1926 and 1927. Putnam died in Blue Earth, Minnesota.

References

1857 births
1944 deaths
People from Blue Earth, Minnesota
People from Grafton, Vermont
Vermont Academy alumni
University of Michigan Law School alumni
Minnesota lawyers
Republican Party Minnesota state senators